Gwangmyeong Cave is a tourist attraction in Gwangmyeong, Gyeonggi-do, South Korea. It is located on the far southwestern outskirts of Seoul.

History 

The cave was used when Korea was under Japanese rule from 1910 to 1945 for mining purposes and was staffed by forced laborers. The cave complex re-opened in 2011 for tourism purposes and now has historical exhibits, but is chiefly entertainment-focused, with aquariums, sculptures, light shows, children's amusements, and other attractions, including an underground winery.

The cave complex is popular, especially for its cooler underground temperatures in summer, but is in a slightly isolated mountainous location. It can be easily reached by car, but the nearest Seoul Metro link is the Gwangmyeong KTX Station, about 2 km away. It was 275 m deep and 7.8 km long.

References

Caves of South Korea
Gwangmyeong
Tourist attractions in Gyeonggi Province
Artificial caves